John Dent Dent (11 June 1826 – 22 December 1894) was a Liberal Party politician in England.

He was born John Dent Trickett, the eldest son of Leeds merchant Joseph Trickett, who had changed his surname to Dent (his mother's maiden name) in 1834 after inheriting Ribston Hall between Wetherby and Knaresborough in Yorkshire.

John Dent Dent was educated at Eton and Trinity College, Cambridge.  He was Member of Parliament (MP) for Knaresborough from 1852 to 1857 and for Scarborough from 1857 to 1859 and from 1860 to 1874. From 1880 to 1894 he was Chairman of the North Eastern Railway Company Board of Directors; significantly he took part in the Railway Inspectorate enquiry into the Thirsk Railway Collision of 1892, and when Signalman Holmes left the enquiry in tears, it was Dent who followed him out of the room to console him.

Dent's five sons included the musicologist Edward Joseph Dent.

References

External links 
 

1826 births
1894 deaths
Liberal Party (UK) MPs for English constituencies
UK MPs 1852–1857
UK MPs 1857–1859
UK MPs 1859–1865
UK MPs 1865–1868
UK MPs 1868–1874
People educated at Eton College
Alumni of Trinity College, Cambridge
North Eastern Railway (UK) people